"Save Your Heart for Me" is a song written by Gary Geld and Peter Udell. The song was originally written for and recorded by singer Brian Hyland in 1963. Although not released as a single in its own right, it was included as the B-side to Hyland's song, "I'm Afraid to Go Home," and appeared on Hyland's 1994 greatest hits album.

"Save Your Heart for Me" is best known in a version recorded in 1965 by American pop group Gary Lewis & the Playboys and appears on the group's 1965 album A Session with Gary Lewis and the Playboys. Lewis and his band released their version as a single in June 1965, and it peaked at number two on the Billboard Hot 100 chart the week of August 21, 1965, behind "I Got You Babe" by Sonny & Cher It went to number one on the Billboard easy listening chart for three weeks in  August 1965. The song was covered by Livingston Taylor in 1993 on his album Good Friends.

Lewis credited the success of the record to both producer Snuff Garrett and to the short length of the song. Since it was less than two minutes duration, Lewis has stated that "(I)t was played everywhere. Deejays loved it."

This song is noted for Lewis's whistling, which is heard in the instrumental introduction, as well as in the brief instrumental portion, before Lewis concludes the song.

Chart history

Weekly charts

Year-end charts

See also
List of number-one adult contemporary singles of 1965 (U.S.)
List of RPM number-one singles of 1965

References

External links
Single release info at discogs.com

1963 songs
1965 singles
Brian Hyland songs
Gary Lewis & the Playboys songs
RPM Top Singles number-one singles
Pop ballads
Song recordings produced by Snuff Garrett
Songs with music by Gary Geld
Songs with lyrics by Peter Udell
Liberty Records singles